The General Inspectorate of Auxiliary Forces is a security institution in Morocco, under the supervision of the Ministry of Interior, and the military regime applies to all of its members. It has an important role in ensuring security throughout the territory of the Kingdom.

Additionally, they contribute to maintaining order and they are also present as border watch, and are the main backup force for firefighters during forest fires. During the Years of Lead, custody facilities such as Tazmamart and Agdz were mainly operated by elements of the auxiliary forces.

The Auxiliary forces are a continuation of a low-rank military unit composed of Senegalese Tirailleurs and Goumiers, used by the French during the protectorate area, to repress Moroccans. Since the official French police patrolled only in the European area, this unit was responsible for maintaining order in the Moroccan neighbourhoods.

Mission and organisation

Mission 
The main missions of the Auxiliary Forces are to establish security throughout the territory of the Kingdom as well as to intervene during particular events or natural disasters, providing aid and assistance to the population.

Organisation 
The administration of the auxiliary forces is divided into two inspectorates, each headed by an inspector general responsible for commanding the units stationed within the limits of its territorial jurisdiction.
 North Zone (El Jadida - Tangier)
 South Zone (Safi-Lagouira)

The Auxiliary Forces consist of several units including:
 Provincial Guard
 Administrative Makhzen (Prefectures, administrative annexes,)
 Intervention Section (Maintenance of public order and public safety)
 Cavalry Teams (Tourist, mountainous, forest areas)
 Canine Teams (Search under the rubble of people in danger in areas of earthquakes, floods and natural disasters)
 Social Services

 General Intervention Group
 Makhzen Mobile Units (Intervention in all regions of the Kingdom)
 Makhzen Mobile Cavalry Units (security in forests and beaches)
 Makhzen Frontier Units (Border guard and fight against immigration and smuggling)
 Mechanized Makhzen Units (light tanks, riot weapons)
 Protection Units of Private Establishments
 Méharistes Units (Camel)

 Support units (logistics, engineering, vehicle maintenance, etc.)

Gallery

History 
Following the Second World War, the post-war French Fourth Republic took control of the French protectorate in Morocco and, rather than releasing wounded goumiers or those who have reached retirement age, the French Army preferred to redeploy them in a subsidiary body. They performed odd jobs and assisted regular troops when needed. Their missions were to suppress the various demonstrations and riots that shook the newly independent Morocco. In "time of peace," the mokhaznis provided security for official buildings and assisted in the delivery of mail in remote regions.

In 1971 and 1972, King Hassan II survived two coup attempts initiated by rebel military factions, which formed a climate of distrust evident between the monarchy and the army. This climate encouraged the growing strength of the police and the revival of the Auxiliary, put on hold since independence. The king personally nominated two senior members of the Royal Moroccan Armed Forces to head the Auxiliary Forces in 1974. The Auxiliary Forces were designated to lead in the maintenance of order and quick restoration of order in affected areas. The Auxiliary Forces were given a special status and a budget of nine billion centimes (a fortune at the time). Two-thirds of the force were virtually incapable of military service due to age and or health reasons, the King had to recruit again and rebuild the whole force, "recalls one officer who served at that time. There was no shortage of candidates but they needed to be disciplined and healthy. Initial recruitment was conducted primarily in the regions of Ouarzazate and Errachidia. The king then created two areas of operation, North and South. In 1975, the Auxiliary Forces were at the front of the Green March.

Western Sahara War 
When war broke out in the Sahara in 1976, the Auxiliary Forces were once again at the forefront. They were armed only with a locally manufactured version of the Beretta M3 sub-machine guns and received very little combat training and were confined by higher to their isolated bases in the middle of the desert and prevented from changing location. Consequently, they were easy prey for the Polisario fighters, and whole companies of them were slaughtered and captured. 
 
In fact, the Moroccan army supreme command (General Dlimi, and Hassan II) underestimated the strength of the enemy and knew nothing of the nature of this region. In addition, King was always afraid to put weapons in the hands of the military but finally, after personally interviewing two Polisario fighters, was the king finally convinced of the military capability of Polisario. Only then did the Moroccan armed forces commit heavily in the Sahara. But the auxiliary forces, serving under the army officers acted as scouts, camp guards and support troops. Almost two-thirds of the casualties of the War of the Sahara belong to the Auxiliary Forces. From 1982, the Auxiliary Forces garrisons stationed at the Sahara participated, alongside the army, in the construction of the wall of defense. Later, operated and secured prisons like Kelaat mgoun or Agdz. Several years after the 1991 cease-fire the Auxiliary Forces remained essential in the management of the Sahara issue. In the mid-'90s, King Hassan II decided to give the region its first football team, he went to the local Auxiliary Forces. Founded in 1978, the Auxiliary Forces of Settat is better known as Bir Baouch, named after a village near Settat. In 1983, the team was transferred to mroud Benslimane before being called again in 1995 the Youth Sports Al Massira, the team that is now the Sahara in the national football championship.

Years of Lead 
In the northern part of the kingdom, during the Years of Lead, the khaki-uniformed Auxiliary Forces were seen as a force of repression. In Fes, Nador and Casablanca, the Auxiliary Forces were accused of being responsible for several atrocities. There was much confusion as the Moroccan Army was often accused of dressing as Auxiliary Forces as they did not think the Auxiliary Forces would fire on unruly crowds because their own children were often in the crowd. Unlike the military, Auxiliary Forces barracks are typically located in the city center. They can be mobilized by the Governor or the Inspector General.

By the early 80s, the Auxiliary Forces were hated by the population. They represented the authority in its most abusive, more brutal form. In addition to the repression of demonstrations, the Auxiliary Forces remained close and had daily contact with the street. They were everywhere: in the souks, the prefectures, hospitals, post offices, stadiums and even at the entrance of cinemas. Simply put, they were an essential part of the state surveillance / repression apparatus.

Administration 
In the prefectures, much of the administrative Makhzen is available to the mayors and governors. They are found today at the entrance of buildings and doors of important people. They do everything, for example, they serve tea, introduce guests, collect the mail, track vendors and chase children playing soccer near the recently renovated public parks by the municipality.

When not used at events or in the prefectures and wilayas, the Auxiliary Forces are assigned to border surveillance. Along the Mediterranean coast to the north, then along the berm to the south and south-west, several units of mobile Auxiliary Forces stand guard. In the early 90s, the units stationed north gained importance, since Morocco embarked on the fight against illegal immigration and drug trafficking. Personnel posted to monitor the border is risen from 3000 in 1992 to 4,500 in 2004. Morocco is under a lot of pressure from the European Union to combat drug trafficking. In 2001, Spanish television showed a member of the Auxiliary Forces loading their drug cargo and then pushing their boat to the sea.

Recruitment 
A candidate for the Auxiliary Forces must meet the following conditions:
 Have Moroccan nationality;
 Be single and at least 18 and at most 24 years old;
 Have a clean criminal record;
 Height greater than 1.70m for men and 1.65m for women;
 Have the qualifying secondary school level or holder of a professional qualification diploma for Mokhazni students, and holder of a baccalaureate certificate for Moussaidin students;
 Have a total visual power of at least 16.

Multi-capability 
General Laanigri, former head of the DGSN, was appointed the head of the Auxiliary Forces. He was charged with modernizing the Auxiliary Forces and preparing them to assume new missions. Following his installation as the Inspectorate General located in Rabat, he created a third operational area that would extend to the borders of Agadir Mauritania. "The geographical distribution that exists today was adopted in 1974. At that time, the Sahara was not yet safe in the geography. Today the region accounts for nearly one-third of the national territory. Creating a third area is therefore obvious, "said a commander of the Auxiliary Forces. Since the end of the 1990s, nearly 6,000 Auxiliary Forces men are stationed along the berm or in the barracks in the south. The Sahara is still a sensitive area where law enforcement is a major challenge.

Another challenge to General Laânigri, like all security officials of the country: the fight against terrorism. Last year, Cherki Drais, the newly appointed head of the DGSN, requested reinforcements for Laânigri. Thus, joint patrols of police and auxiliary forces of elements have emerged in major cities. Between officers of FA, there is even talk of preparing a new status for their bodies, with new missions and new ways (including weapons and dogs). According to cross the Mobile Intervention Unit (the famous CMI) should be dissolved in the DGSN, to be replaced by units of the Auxiliary Forces. "The units to be trained at the highest level insists this specialist in military matters. Since Morocco is recycle the body of FA as much to do in depth. An element of the FA should be perfectly versatile to intervene with gendarmes, police, military, customs or brigades of Water and Forests. " According to some of his collaborators, Laânigri floor on the thorny issue of image mroud. Further held, communication campaign, training abroad ..."None of these tracks is excluded", they say within the Inspectorate General.

Armaments 
Auxiliary Forces are equipped with machine guns PAMAS G1, MAS 36, MAT 49, MAC 24/29, AK-47 and FN MAG, and armed armored vehicle 32 UR 416 and Panhard AML 60.

The Moroccan Auxiliary Forces took delivery of 88 Lenco BearCat armored vehicles in riot control, troop transport, communications, convoy protection, and SWAT variants.

Grades 
 General Inspector (named by the King)
 Chief Inspector
 Chief 1st Class
 Chief 2nd Class
 Chief 3rd Class
 Inspector 
 1st Class
 2nd Class
 3rd Class

 Moussaidin  
 Moussaid Chief 1st Class
 Moussaid Chief 2nd Class
 Moussaid 1st Class
 Moussaid 2nd Class

 Mokhaznis 
 Brigadier-Chef
 Brigadier
 Mokhazni

References

Sources 
 Article at Telquel-online

External links 
  Portail national du Maroc

Law enforcement in Morocco
Military of Morocco